Trimerodytes praemaxillaris is a species of snake in the subfamily Natricinae of the family Colubridae. It is also known commonly as Angel's mountain keelback, Angel's stream snake, and the brown stream snake. The species is endemic to Southeast Asia.

Geographic range
T. praemaxillaris is found in China (Yunnan province), northern Laos, and Thailand.

Habitat

Description
Dorsally, T. praemaxillaris is brown. Ventrally, it is dirty yellowish. The dorsal scales are smooth and are in 19 rows at midbody.

Diet
T. praemaxillaris preys upon aquatic annelids.

Reproduction
T. praemaxillaris is oviparous. The cotypes are hatchlings, each with an egg-tooth and a fresh umbilical scar.

References

Further reading
Angel F (1929). "Liste de reptiles et batraciens du Haut-Laos recueillis par M. Delcour. Descriptions d'un genre, de 2 espèces et d'une variété d'ophidiens ". Bulletin du Muséum national d'histoire naturelle de Paris, série 2, 1: 75-81. (Paratapinophis, new genus; P. praemaxillaris, new species). (in French).
Das I (2012). A Naturalist's Guide to the Snakes of South-East Asia: Malaysia, Singapore, Thailand, Myanmar, Borneo, Sumatra, Java and Bali. Oxford, England: John Beaufoy Publishing. 176 pp. .
Murphy JC, Chan-ard T, Mekchai S, Cota M, Voris HK (2008). "The Rediscovery of Angel's Stream Snake, Paratapinophis praemaxillaris Angel, 1929 (Reptilia: Serpentes: Natricidae)". The Natural History Journal of Chulalongkorn University 8 (2): 169-183.
Rasmussen JB (1982). "A new record of the rare Opisthotropis praemaxillaris (Serpentes: Colubridae)". Amphibia-Reptilia 3 (2): 279-280.

Trimerodytes
Reptiles described in 1861
Taxa named by Fernand Angel
Reptiles of China
Reptiles of Laos
Reptiles of Thailand